Glanzenberg is a railway station in Switzerland, situated in the city of Dietikon. The station is located on the Zurich to Olten main line and is a stop of the Zurich S-Bahn served by line S11 and S12.

References 

Railway stations in the canton of Zürich
Swiss Federal Railways stations
Dietikon